Kattskill Bay is a hamlet in the towns of Queensbury in Warren County and Fort Ann in Washington County in the state of New York, United States. The hamlet is located along the shore of Warner and Van Warmer Bays of Lake George. Kattskill Bay was part of the proposed East Lake George village. Pilot Knob Road is the major highway that runs through the hamlet. The hamlet is located at the base of Buck Mountain.

Kattskill Bay is also the name assigned by the United States Postal Service to ZIP code 12844. Pilot Knob is also an acceptable name.

References

 

Hamlets in New York (state)
Queensbury, New York
Hamlets in Warren County, New York
Hamlets in Washington County, New York